Haworthia is a large genus of small succulent plants endemic to Southern Africa 
(Mozambique, Namibia, Lesotho, Eswatini and South Africa).

Like the aloes, they are members of the subfamily Asphodeloideae and they generally resemble miniature aloes, except in their flowers, which are distinctive in appearance. They are popular garden and container plants.

Description and characteristics
The inflorescences of some species may exceed  in height. 
The plants can grow solitary or can be clump-forming. Many species have firm, tough, fleshy leaves, usually dark green in colour, whereas others are softer and contain leaf windows with translucent panels through which sunlight can reach internal photosynthetic tissues.  Their flowers are small, and generally white. Though they are very similar between species, flowers from the species in section Hexangulares generally have green striations and those from other species often have brown lines in the flowers. However, their leaves show wide variations even within one species.
Additionally, when the plants are stressed (e.g. deprived of water), their colours can change to reds and purples. Depriving them of nitrogen generally results in paler leaves.

Distribution
Most species are endemic to South Africa, with the greatest species diversity occurring in the south-western Cape. Some species do however extend into neighbouring territories, in Eswatini (formerly Swaziland), southern Namibia and southern Mozambique (Maputaland).

Naming and taxonomy
Haworthia is a genus within the family Asphodelaceae, subfamily Asphodeloideae. The genus is named after the botanist Adrian Hardy Haworth.  B. Bayer recognised approximately 60 species in a review of the genus in 2012, whereas other taxonomists are very much less conservative.  Related genera are Aloe, Gasteria and Astroloba and intergeneric hybrids are known.

Subdivisions
The classification of the flowering plant subfamily Asphodeloideae is weak, and concepts of the genera are not well substantiated. Haworthia has been a similarly a weakly contrived genus. Because of their horticultural interest, its taxonomy has been dominated by amateur collectors, and the literature is rife with misunderstanding of what the taxa actually are or should be. Recent phylogenetic studies have demonstrated that the traditional divisions of the genus are actually relatively unrelated (Hexangulares was shown to be a sister-group of genus Gasteria, Robustipedunculares more closely related to genus Astroloba, and Haworthia as an out-group related to Aloe). In recognition of the polyphyletic nature of the genus, Haworthiopsis and Tulista have been split off.

Botanists had long noticed differences in the flowers the three subgenera, but had previously considered those differences to be inconsequential, although the differences between species in the same subgenus definitely are.   The roots, leaves and rosettes do demonstrate some generic differences while wide variations occur even within one species.

Species
Many species of Haworthia have been moved to Haworthiopsis and Tulista, in particular since the last update of The Plant List (2013), which contains about 150 accepted species of Haworthia. The actual number and identification of the species is not well established; many species are listed as "unresolved" for lack of sufficient information, and the full list reflects the difficulties of Haworthia taxonomy, including many varieties and synonyms. The World Checklist of Selected Plant Families has been updated to exclude the species now in Haworthiopsis and Tulista. The species it accepts  are listed below, excluding Haworthia kingiana and Haworthia minor, placed in Tulista by other sources.

 Haworthia akaonii M.Hayashi – Western Cape Provinces
 Haworthia angustifolia Haw. – Southern Cape Provinces
 Haworthia ao-onii M.Hayashi – Cape Provinces
 Haworthia arachnoidea (L.) Duval – Southwestern Cape Provinces
 Haworthia aristata Haw. – Southern Cape Provinces
 Haworthia bayeri J.D.Venter & S.A.Hammer – Southwestern Cape Provinces
 Haworthia blackburniae W.F.Barker – Southwestern Cape Provinces
 Haworthia bolusii Baker – Southern central and southern Cape Provinces to Free State
 Haworthia caesia M.Hayashi – Western Cape Provinces
 Haworthia calva M.Hayashi – Eastern Cape Provinces
 Haworthia chloracantha Haw. – Southwestern Cape Provinces
 Haworthia coarctata
 Haworthia compacta (Triebner) Breuer – Cape Provinces
 Haworthia cooperi Baker – Southern Cape Provinces
 Haworthia cymbiformis (Haw.) Duval – Southern and southeastern Cape Provinces
 Haworthia decipiens Poelln. – Southern Cape Provinces
 Haworthia diaphana M.Hayashi – Eastern Cape Provinces
 Haworthia elizeae Breuer – Western Cape Provinces
 Haworthia emelyae Poelln. – Southwestern Cape Provinces
 Haworthia fasciata
 Haworthia floribunda Poelln. – Southwestern Cape Provinces
 Haworthia fukuyae M.Hayashi – Eastern Cape Provinces
 Haworthia grenieri Breuer – Western Cape Provinces
 Haworthia heidelbergensis G.G.Sm. – Southwestern Cape Provinces
 Haworthia herbacea (Mill.) Stearn – Southwestern Cape Provinces
 Haworthia lockwoodii Archibald – Southwestern Cape Provinces
 Haworthia maculata (Poelln.) M.B.Bayer – Southwestern Cape Provinces
 Haworthia magnifica Poelln. – Southwestern Cape Provinces
 Haworthia maraisii Poelln. – Southwestern Cape Provinces
 Haworthia marumiana Uitewaal – Cape Provinces
 Haworthia mirabilis (Haw.) Haw. – Southwestern Cape Provinces
 Haworthia mollis M.Hayashi – Eastern Cape Provinces
 Haworthia monticola Fourc. – Southwestern Cape Provinces
 Haworthia mucronata Haw. – Southwestern Cape Provinces
 Haworthia mutica Haw. – Southwestern Cape Provinces
 Haworthia nortieri G.G.Sm. – Southwestern Cape Provinces
 Haworthia outeniquensis M.B.Bayer – Southwestern Cape Provinces
 Haworthia parksiana Poelln. – Southwestern Cape Provinces
 Haworthia pubescens M.B.Bayer – Southwestern Cape Provinces
 Haworthia pulchella M.B.Bayer – Southwestern Cape Provinces
 Haworthia pygmaea Poelln. – Southwestern Cape Provinces
 Haworthia regina M.Hayashi – Eastern Cape Provinces
 Haworthia reinwardtii 
 Haworthia reticulata (Haw.) Haw. – Southwestern Cape Provinces
 Haworthia retusa (L.) Duval – Southwestern Cape Provinces
 Haworthia rossouwii Poelln. – Cape Provinces
 Haworthia sapphaia M.Hayashi – Eastern Cape Provinces
 Haworthia semiviva (Poelln.) M.B.Bayer – Cape Provinces
 Haworthia springbokvlakensis C.L.Scott – Southern Cape Provinces
 Haworthia subularis M.Hayashi – Eastern Cape Provinces
 Haworthia tesselata 
 Haworthia transiens (Poelln.) M.Hayashi – Southern Cape Provinces
 Haworthia truncata Schönland – Southwestern Cape Provinces
 Haworthia turgida Haw. – Southwestern Cape Provinces
 Haworthia variegata L.Bolus – Southwestern Cape Provinces
 Haworthia veltina M.Hayashi – Eastern Cape Provinces
 Haworthia villosa M.Hayashi – Eastern Cape Provinces
 Haworthia vlokii M.B.Bayer – Southwestern Cape Provinces
 Haworthia wittebergensis W.F.Barker – Southwestern Cape Provinces
 Haworthia zantneriana Poelln. – Southern Cape Provinces

Cultivation

There is widespread special collector interest, and some species such as Haworthia cymbiformis are fairly common house and garden plants.

Almost all Haworthia species are naturally adapted for semi-shade conditions (in habitat they tend to grow under bushes or rock overhangs) and they are therefore healthiest in shade or semi-shade. Some species like Haworthia pumila and Haworthia truncata can be adapted to tolerate full-sun however.

All Haworthia species favour extremely well-drained soil (in habitat they tend to grow in poor sands, in rocky areas). Watering depends on the species (winter or summer rainfall) but most of the common species are tolerant of a variety of watering routines. Over-watering can cause the roots to rot. Rarer species may have more specific requirements. All haworthias are sensitive to frost, and they are rated as winter hardy to USDA zone 10.

Haworthia species reproduce both through seed and through budding, or offsets. Certain species or clones may be more successful or rapid in offset production, and these pups are easily removed to yield new plants once a substantial root system has developed on the offshoot. Less reliably, the plants may also be propagated through leaf cuttings, and in some instances, through tissue culture.

Gallery for identification

References

External links

Haworthia (Ingo Breuer)
Haworthia (Jakub Jilemicky)
Asphodelaceae Anonymous (Lawrence Loucka)
Haworthia Society 
Haworthia Updates (M.B.Bayer)

 
Flora of Southern Africa
Asphodelaceae genera